Steve West (born 5 June 1975) is an English darts player. He is the younger brother of 2003 World Master Tony West.

BDO career
West showed signs of a promising career quickly by reaching the final of the 2005 French Open, losing to local Dominique le Roy. He also reached the last 32 of the 2005 World Masters where he lost to Gary Anderson. In 2007, West reached another Open final in the 2007 Dutch Open, one of the BDO's biggest Open tournaments. Amongst his scalps were Dutchmen Co Stompé and Edwin Max before losing in the final to Scott Waites. Following this and three further quarter-finals, he qualified for the 2007 International Darts League, but was knocked out at the Preliminary Group Stage.

West then won his first Open title, winning the 2007 Denmark Open, beating the Netherlands' Niels de Ruiter in the semi-finals and then beat fellow Englishman James Wilson in the final. His performances earned him qualification for the 2008 BDO World Championship. He faced former World Champion Ted Hankey in the first round and lost 3–2 despite leading 2–1. West bounced back from his Lakeside defeat to win the 2008 German Gold Cup beating Andree Welge in the final. He then won the Finnish Open, beating local favourite and former Masters finalist Jarkko Komula in the semi-finals and then beat Norway's Robert Wagner in the final. He also made two semi-final showings in the Belgium Open and the French Open and reached the quarter-finals of the Northern Ireland Open. These performances helped West qualify automatically for the 2009 BDO World Championship at the Lakeside, where he was the number 13 seed. However, he was outclassed by Alan Norris 3–0 in the first round. West could not better this in 2010 either, as once again he relinquished a 2–1 lead this time to Irish débutante Martin McCloskey.  In 2011, West once more lost in the first round to 2010 finalist Dave Chisnall after missing three darts at double top to win before Chisnall came back to force a tiebreak in the final set and eventually win. In 2012, West lost in the first round of the BDO World Championship for the fifth year in a row against former runner-up and world #1 Tony O'Shea. This levelled him with Davy Richardson and Tony Payne for the record of most first-round losses at the World Championship before finally winning.

It was announced at the end of the 2012 BDO World Championship that Steve would be one of many players to compete in the rival PDC's 'Q School' the following season, including his brother Tony.

PDC career
Stevie won a PDC tour card in the second day of 2012 qualifiers, defeating Gino Vos in the last round a day after Tony had earned his card. However, he did not play the full schedule of PDC ProTour events due to major hip surgery and could not advance beyond the last 64 in any of the ones he did play. He returned in 2013 to play in each of the eight UK Open Qualifiers where his best result came in event five, losing in the last 16 to Jelle Klaasen. West was placed 44th on the UK Open Order of Merit to enter the event in the second round, where he beat Jake Pennington 5–3. Further wins followed over Ian White and Richie Burnett to set up a fifth round meeting against Peter Wright, which he lost 9–4. The furthest he advanced during the rest of the season came in two Players Championships where he lost in the last 32 to Paul Nicholson and Wright both by 6–4 scorelines.

West's two-year PDC tour card expired after the 2014 World Championship and he finished outside the top 64 on the Order of Merit so therefore entered Q School in January 2014 to retain his place. He was successful on the final day by defeating Mareno Michels 5–3 in his last match, revealing afterwards that he has changed his throwing action due to a hip replacement and bone graft he received in late 2012. He qualified for the UK Open where he lost 5–4 against Tony Randall in the second round. West played in two European Tour events during the campaign, the German Darts Masters and European Darts Trophy, and was defeated by Dave Chisnall and Simon Whitlock both in the second round.

West began 2015 just outside the top 64 in the world rankings as he was number 66 and so once again entered Q School. On the third day he came through the event for the third time by beating Tim Martin 5–2 in the final round to earn a fresh two-year tour card. He was eliminated in the last 16 stage of four Players Championships during the year and lost 6–5 to Terry Jenkins in the second round of the European Darts Trophy after leading 4–1. West made his debut in the Grand Slam of Darts this year after overcoming Dean Winstanley, Wes Newton, Robert Owen and Eddie Dootson in the qualifying event. He finished third in his group after losing 5–2 and 5–3 to Kim Huybrechts and Michael van Gerwen and recording a 5–0 whitewash over Mark Oosterhuis.

In 2016 West's best results came in the second half of the year. Wins over Mike Zuydwijk, William O'Connor, Jeffrey de Zwaan, Simon Whitlock, Cristo Reyes and Ricky Evans at the 16th Players Championship event saw him play in his first PDC final. West was 4–2 down to Michael van Gerwen, but took out a 116 finish to lead 5–4. He threw for the title in a deciding leg and was unable to take out 110 as Van Gerwen won it 6–5. A semi-final followed in the 18th event after beating Adrian Lewis 6–3 and he lost 6–1 to Whitlock. The result qualified him for the World Grand Prix and he pulled off what he called the biggest moment of his darting life by knocking out 11-time winner of the event Phil Taylor 2–1. He lost 3–0 to Daryl Gurney in the second round with each set going to a deciding leg. He met his brother Tony in the first round of the German Darts Championship and averaged 109.98 in a 6–0 whitewash. West went on to see off Stephen Bunting 6–2 and Kim Huybrechts 6–5, before being defeated 6–2 by Alan Norris in the quarter-finals. He qualified for his first European Championship and lost the first five legs against Jelle Klaasen in the opening round and went on to be eliminated 6–3.

On his PDC World Championship debut, West won the opening two sets and was on 36 for the match in the third, when Mervyn King took out 136, went on to win the set and level at 2–2. In the decider, West missed two match darts and was knocked out 3–2.

After a solid 2017 in which West reached a Pro Tour final (losing to Michael van Gerwen in a deciding leg) and won several matches in televised majors, West finally picked up his first ever victory at either version of the world championship at the seventh time of asking, by defeating Benito van de Pas 3-1 in the first round. He followed this with a win over another Dutchman, Jermaine Wattimena, 4-1 after surviving several darts to go 1-0 down. He was defeated by two-time champion Gary Anderson 4-2 in the last 16.
West lost his tour card following the 2023 World Championship.

World Championship results

BDO
2008: First round (lost to Ted Hankey 2–3)
2009: First round (lost to Alan Norris 0–3)
2010: First round (lost to Martin McCloskey 2–3)
2011: First round (lost to Dave Chisnall 2–3)
2012: First round (lost to Tony O'Shea 0–3)

PDC
2017: First round (lost to Mervyn King 2–3)
2018: Third round (lost to Gary Anderson 2–4)
2019: Third round (lost to Devon Petersen 2–4)
2020: Second round (lost to Ryan Searle 0–3)
 2021: Second round (lost to Peter Wright 1–3)

Performance timeline

References

External links
                

1975 births
English darts players
Living people
People from Epping
British Darts Organisation players
British expatriates in the Netherlands
Sportspeople from Essex
Professional Darts Corporation former tour card holders